The chief executive of the city of Summit, New Jersey since it was incorporated in 1899 has been a mayor. Currently the city operates under a weak mayor system of municipal government where the mayor is mostly a ceremonial role that operates as the city's official spokesman. They do not have the power to vote in the city council, unless in the event of a tie. However, they can use their office as a bully pulpit to promote and oppose candidates for other positions in the city. Additionally they can appoint the chief of police and the board of education. In the 1970s the term for a mayor was lengthened from 2 years to 4 years; there are no term limits.

Mayors of Summit

References

Summit